The list is based on CIA World Factbook estimates for the year 2023. The list includes all members of the Council of Europe and Belarus; dependent territories and non-fully recognised states are omitted.

List

2023

2022

References 

Population Growth Rate
Population Growth Rate, Europe